Sales process engineering is intended to design better ways of selling and make salespeople's efforts more productive. It has been described as "the systematic application of scientific and mathematical principles to achieve the practical goals of a particular sales process". Paul Selden pointed out that in this context, sales referred to the output of a process involving a variety of functions across an organization, and not that of a "sales department" alone. Primary areas of application span functions including sales, marketing, and customer service.

History
As early as 1900–1915, advocates of scientific management, such as Frederick Winslow Taylor and Harlow Stafford Person, recognized that their ideas could be applied not only to manual labour and skilled trades but also to management, professions, and sales. Person promoted an early form of sales process engineering. At the time, postwar senses of the terms sales process engineering and sales engineering did not yet exist; Person called his efforts "sales engineering".

The evolution of modern corporate life in the 1920s through 1960s, sought to apply analysis and synthesis to improve the methods of all functions within a business. After the famous NBC Whitepaper in 1980 titled "If Japan Can... Why Can't We?" the 1980s and 1990s saw the emergence of a variety of approaches, such as business process reengineering, Total Quality Management, Six Sigma, and Lean Manufacturing. Inevitably some of the people involved in these initiatives tried to begin applying what they learned to sales and marketing.

For instance, Cas Welch was instrumental in designing and installing Westinghouse Electric's Total Quality program. As one of the first such programs in American industry, it was emulated by other firms and government agencies. His audits of Westinghouse sales offices caused him to realize companies were mistaken in their assumption that quality applied primarily to products. "Their focus has been to remove the flies from the soup after the customer complains; not to cook the soup without flies in the first place ... when it would be less expensive and time-consuming for the sales person to do it right the first time."

James Cortada was one of IBM's management consultants on market-driven quality. His book TQM for Sales and Marketing Management was the first attempt to explain the theory of TQM in a sales and marketing context. George Antoin Smith, Jr. in Naperville, Illinois, an electrical engineering graduate of Purdue University, had been a successful field sales engineer and district sales manager of Hewlett Packard electronic components to OEMs. In 1989 George Smith received the HP President's Club Award for career excellence in HPs sales organization. In 1992, he started a consulting company to demonstrate to sales managers how they could tactically measure and improve sales productivity.  He also wrote the Sales Quality Audit. Todd Youngblood, another ex-IBMer, in his book The Dolphin and the Cow (2004) emphasized "three core principles": continuous improvement of the sales process, metrics to quantitatively judge the rate and degree of improvement, and a well-defined sales process.

Meanwhile, another executive from IBM, Daniel Stowell, had participated in IBM's expansion from selling hardware in the 1960s and '70s "the only way it knew how, through face-to-face sales" to the company's first use of a market channel in a project known as the "Alternate Channels Marketing Test." The idea was to incorporate direct response marketing techniques to accomplish the job of direct salespeople, and the initiative was quite successful. Notably, his story illustrated the need for "consensus management" of the sales team. Traditional ways of managing sales people did not work when team members who had to develop a new way of selling were embedded in 14 different sales offices around the US.

The culture of sales was based on intuition and gut feel, not on data and mathematical logic like the culture of operational excellence. However, many people inside the quality movement could see that the scientific mindset ought to apply to sales and marketing. Paul Selden's "Sales Process Engineering, A Personal Workshop" was a further attempt to demonstrate the applicability of the theory and tools of quality management to the sales function.

Brent Wahba, an engineer with a background in Lean at GM and Delphi Automotive, also saw that root cause thinking had not yet penetrated the culture of sales and marketing management. His book "The Fluff Cycle," criticized business writers in sales and marketing. He observed that traditional "best practices" approach as well as the insights of sales consultants usually do not work for very long. His point was that this is precisely because they are transplanted from outside the company, rather than being the result of people inside the company improving their thinking about the problems they face.

Wahba's point was not a new one, however. In his book High-Impact Consulting, Robert Shaffer made a resounding statement about all kinds of consulting - not just sales and marketing: "No matter how wise and creative the consultant's analysis and recommendations, they pay off only to the extent that the client does what is necessary to benefit from them. The result is that many consulting projects fail to contribute nearly as much as they might because of the implementation gap, and a great many produce virtually no lasting benefit."

Most executives are not taught to pay attention to how their employees think and solve problems. Instead, as described by Brian Joiner in his book Fourth Generation Management, they tend to either dictate the activities they want their people to follow (called "2nd generation" management), or (when that fails) hand down objectives without regard for how they will be achieved (called "3rd generation" management).

In this environment, some companies are looking for alternatives. Robert Pryor points out in his book, Lean Selling,'' that  "Lean is a methodology that revolutionizes the processes for producing products and for delivering services, and the Lean Thinking that captures its principles are the most disruptive and transformational management ideas since the Industrial Revolution that began over 100 years ago."

Rationale

The sales decision process is a formalized sales process companies use to manage the decision process behind a sale. SDP “is a defined series of steps you follow as you guide prospects from initial contact to purchase.” 

Reasons for having a well-thought-out sales process include seller and buyer risk management, standardized customer interaction during sales, and scalable revenue generation.  Approaching the subject from a "process" point of view offers an opportunity to use design and improvement tools from other disciplines and process-oriented industries.

See also
 Sales management
 Theory of constraints

References

Bibliography
 
 
 
 

Customer experience
Process engineering
Sales
Personal selling
Promotion and marketing communications